Ahlfors is a Finnish surname. Notable people with the surname include:

Anselm Ahlfors (1897–1974), Finnish wrestler
Fanny Ahlfors (1884–1947), Finnish politician
Lars Ahlfors (1907–1996), Finnish mathematician

Finland Swedish surnames